is a manga series by Shinobu Takayama, serialized in Monthly Comic Zero Sum. A 13 episode anime adaptation produced by Studio Deen premiered on April 4, 2008.

Plot

Tokidoki is a Japanese high school student who, when he fails his history class, is sent to a high-tech history museum that virtually recreates the Edo period to do make-up work. However, what was supposed to be a simple school project becomes much more complicated when he's attacked by two supernatural beings known as "the nue" and "the yakou" and loses the vision in his left eye. After he's saved from the nue by a girl named Kuchiha, he realizes that he's no longer wearing the simulation goggles, and is trapped in the virtual Edo. Meanwhile, in the real world, Sensai Corporation, the virtual reality company who made the virtual museum Tokidoki is trapped in, is seen throughout the story.

Characters

Main characters
 
Tokidoki is an easygoing high school student. As a child, he was sent to boarding school by his parents who barely kept in touch with him. He was consequently taken care of by Suoh Kuwata, a law breaker type of guy who became a very important figure in his life, and a young woman named Chitose.
Tokidoki is not good at history, and as a result has to go on a field trip to a museum that has an interactive virtual reality (VR) reproduction of the Edo period. While in the VR world, he is attacked by a nue who seems to be controlled by a small being called "Yakou". He is rescued by a woman (Kuchiha) yielding a sword.
As a consequence of the attack, he loses vision on his left eye and finds himself trapped in this simulation of the Edo period. After becoming acquainted with the virtual universe, he seems to adapt quickly to his new surroundings. He goes under the care of Lord Shamon, a priest who cares after Kuchiha and a guy named Kon, whom he met in the real world before his attack. After meeting some interesting characters, both human and demon, he finds himself having to choose between siding with the demons, or with the humans, who seem to be at war with each other. He is stuck in a gray area, not wanting to choose either side. While in this new universe, Tokidoki is called by some the "Hakutaku," (白紙の者, "the blank page"), as his fate isn't foretold by Heaven's Net as is everyone's else.
 
A member of Tokidoki's high school who is cool-headed and logical, but has a reputation for getting into fights. He was also attacked by the Nue and Yakou, which left him with no sensation in his right arm and trapped in Edo. He arrived two years before Tokidoki, a fact pointed out as strange by the pair as they were both attacked by the Nue on the same day in the present, and acts as Tokidoki's mentor after his arrival. Later on in the story, Kon's memories are altered by Heaven and he no longer remembers the original world he came from, or Tokidoki.
 
A swordswoman who has a Dog God (inugami) living inside her, and as a result, is despised by humans. She saved Tokidoki from the nue. At first, she hates optimistic and naive people like Tokidoki, but she warms up to him throughout the course of the series. She usually wears her hair in a long ponytail, and has a big appetite. She and Kon are friends who love to hate each other. When she was a child, her grandfather named her Kuchiha, which means "faded flowers", in hopes that she would be the last of the family. After her grandfather's death, she became unable to tend to herself, and lived alone in the shack where she once lived with her grandfather. It is here that she is discovered by Kanzou, a boy with marked fangs over his teeth. Kuchiha lost the ability to speak, but Kanzou understood her and tended to her needs. One day, he set off to find a place where she would belong, and told her to wait where she was. However, she walked away from where she was supposed to wait, getting lost, and losing Kanzou, who was no longer able to find her. Years later, Kanzou finds her again, explaining that their destinies are bound together, for she is the dog god, and he is the destined servant of the dog god, Shirachigo( Gazu Hyakki Yakō ). Kuchiha, believing that Kanzou abandoned her, refuses to go along with him at first, but she concedes, leaving Toki with these words: "I'm not like you." Recently in the series, she saves Tokidoki from the vortex by fighting the monster and cutting her hair after it got a grip of her. Rikugou jumps in after her, confessing his love and getting bitten in the neck. Kuchiha is stuck in the vortex, with a concerned Tokidoki and Kanzou. Her age is unknown.

Other characters
 
In public, he's a temple priest, but in private, he's a demon hunter. He is Kuchiha's foster father.
 
A friend of Tokidoki and Kon. He later becomes friends with Tsuyukusa. He gets teased by Kon for having strange and large eyes. He's severely injured by Imayou, but is healed and brought to health by Tsuyukusa. Later, he helps convince Tsuyukusa to break free from his mad frenzy.
 
One of the four Holy Ones and the High Priestess of the Sakigami shrine. Originally believed to have been cursed by the demon Byakuroku, it was later revealed that his spirit was in fact placed within Byakuroku's body, as an attempt by Bonten to preserve them both (after a battle that would have cost both their lives). Ginshu is actually male, but is referred to as a Princess anyway. It is revealed that Ginshu is actually not the real High Priestess, but a decoy to protect the real High Priestess, Shinshu. He possesses "poison blood" to demons, so when they try to eat him they die.
 
Ginshu's younger sister. She can never age and is forever a child, and is actually the real High Priestess and possesses the power of foresight through the use of dreams. She is very innocent and cute, and is very fond of Ginshu. It is hinted that she used to play with Tsuyukusa when he was a child. Shinshu once had the power to alter Heaven's Net, but this was lost as a bargain to save Ginshu after the incident.
 
Ginshu's attendant. She has been loyal to Ginshu since she was a child, and heavily quarreled with Shinshu. It is revealed that she is from a well off family, but has chosen to serve Ginshu.
 
A government official in charge of demon hunting. He and Shamon are old friends.
 
A strange person on the orders of Sasaki to watch Tokidoki. He has a pet demon, a Fire Rat. He also knows how to handle demons.
 
A powerful demon with the ability to read fate. He is one of the four Holy Ones. He has known Ginshu since he was a child. On their first encounter Bonten tried to kill Ginshu, but found out that it was futile (as Ginshu revealed he was just a decoy for Shinshu). He was very fond of Ginshu, but unlike Ginshu, he did not like to openly admit it and often spoke to him rudely. He spent most of the winter as a child playing with Ginshu in various games. However, their relationship changed drastically after the priestess of the Sakigami shrine severely injured Tsuyukusa. A bloody battle took place, and as Ginshu and Byakuroku killed each other, a deal was made with Heaven, so that Shinshu's power was transferred to Bonten, and he replaced Byakuroku taking his place as Heaven's Seat.
 
A kodama (Tree Spirit) who works with Bonten. He resents humans for the death of Byakuroku, but seems to have little trouble befriending them.
 
A tengu who serves Bonten. Utsubushi regards Bonten as his 'father' as he is in fact a collaboration of spirits Bonten had gathered and given form to.
 
A kitsune who resents humans for the death of her master. She's corrupted by the Yakou after killing humans. She is later saved by Tokidoki, and afterward reverts to her original form.
 
An old and powerful snake demon who, at the brink of death after biting into Ginshu's 'poison blood', became the vessel for Ginshu's spirit. He raised Bonten and Tsuyukusa.
  
A member of Heaven's seat who is actually the Yakou. He is seen with Bonten, Utsubushi, and Tsuyukusa.

Part of the Onmyou Bureau; group that hunts demons; she wears a cloth over her eye. She is a refined woman, and she had also made an arrangement with Sasaki to give him the power to see demons in exchange for his eyesight. She teases Tokidoki, thinking he likes Kuchiha.

Production

The animated television series Amatsuki is directed by Kazuhiro Furuhashi and produced by Studio Deen. 13 episodes were produced.

Music
Opening Theme
"Casting Dice" by Yuuki Kanno

Ending Theme
"Namae no Nai Michi (名まえのない道; A Road with No Name)" by Kaori Hikita

References

External links 
 Amatsuki Official site 
 Amatsuki Studio Deen Official site 
 

2008 anime television series debuts
Anime series based on manga
AT-X (TV network) original programming
Ichijinsha manga
Josei manga
Manga adapted into television series
Studio Deen
Yōkai in anime and manga